Terry Kevin Stretton (23 May 1953 – 12 December 2018) is a former English cricketer. Stretton was a right-handed batsman who bowled right-arm medium pace. He was born at Cosby, Leicestershire.

Stretton made his first-class debut for Leicestershire against Oxford University in 1972. On the fringes of the Leicestershire first eleven, he made a further appearance in 1972 against Yorkshire in the County Championship, while the following season he made a single appearance in the 1973 County Championship against Lancashire. He made two further first-class appearances in 1974, against the touring Pakistanis and Middlesex in the County Championship, before making a final first-class appearance against the touring Australians in 1975. In his six first-class appearances, he took 4 wickets at an average of 84.50, with best figures of 2/71. With the bat, he scored 20 runs at a batting average of 5.00, with a high score of 6 not out.

Stretton died in December 2018 following a brief illness.

References

External links
Terry Stretton at ESPNcricinfo
Terry Stretton at CricketArchive

1953 births
2018 deaths
People from Cosby, Leicestershire
Cricketers from Leicestershire
English cricketers
Leicestershire cricketers